The Morrison Plantation Smokehouse is a historic plantation outbuilding in rural Hot Spring County, Arkansas.  Located off County Road 15 near Saginaw, it is the last surviving remnant of a once-extensive forced labor camp.  It was built about 1854, probably by the forced labor of enslaved people, on the plantation of Daniel Morrison.

It is a hexagonal structure, built out of dry laid fieldstone, and capped with a hip roof that has a gabled venting cupola at the top.

The building was listed on the National Register of Historic Places in 1977.

See also
National Register of Historic Places listings in Hot Spring County, Arkansas

References

Agricultural buildings and structures on the National Register of Historic Places in Arkansas
Buildings and structures completed in 1854
National Register of Historic Places in Hot Spring County, Arkansas
Plantations in Arkansas
Smokehouses
1854 establishments in Arkansas
Hexagonal buildings